Nagqu railway station, also spelled Naqu and Nagchu, is a station on the Chinese railway to Tibet serving Nagqu, Tibet.

Station layout 
The station has a crossing loop and several goods sidings adjacent to the passenger station.  The goods sidings are connected to the main line via a shunting neck which trails to Up trains (trains to Beijing).

See also 

 Qingzang railway
 List of stations on Qingzang railway

Gallery

References 

Stations on the Qinghai–Tibet Railway
Railway stations in Tibet